Cross Roads is an unincorporated community in Montgomery-Smalley Township, Monroe County, Arkansas, United States. The community is located where Arkansas Highway 17 ends at Arkansas Highway 1.

References

Unincorporated communities in Monroe County, Arkansas
Unincorporated communities in Arkansas